{{DISPLAYTITLE:C6H13NO5}}
The molecular formula C6H13NO5 (molar mass: 179.17 g/mol, exact mass: 179.0794 u) may refer to:

 Galactosamine
 Glucosamine
 Mannosamine
 Nojirimycin
 Tricine

Molecular formulas